Johnson County Executive Airport  is a public airport located four miles (6 km) southeast of the central business district (CBD) of Olathe, a city in Johnson County, Kansas, United States. Measured by number of aircraft operations, the facility was the fourth-busiest airport in the state of Kansas in 2018. The airport was on the FAA's list of airports whose control tower could be closed in September 2013, but it remains in operation.

History
The airport was built as a naval auxiliary field for use in World War II. It was deeded to the city of Olathe in 1951, and to Johnson County in 1967.

The airport had commercial airline service provided by Air Midwest from 1973 through 1977 and again briefly in 1984. Air Midwest had nonstop flights to the Kansas City International Airport and the Wichita Mid-Continent Airport using Beechcraft 99 and Fairchild Swearingen Metroliner II aircraft. In 1984 the carrier also had nonstop service to the St. Louis Downtown Airport.

On March 7, 2017, a severe storm damaged several hangars and airplanes at Johnson County Executive Airport. The damages were blamed on straight-line winds reaching .

Facilities 

 Runway 18/36: 4,098 x 75 ft. (1,249 x 23 m), surface: concrete
 Helipad H1: 100 x 75 ft. (30 x 23 m), surface: asphalt (closed indefinitely)

For the twelve-month period ending August 31, 2018, the airport had 36,931 aircraft operations, an average of 101 per day: 98% general aviation, 2% air taxi, and less than 1% military. In March 2020, there were 63 aircraft based at this airport: 56 single-engine, 6 multi-engine, and 1 helicopter.

FBOs
Kansas City Aviation Center is an FBO at Johnson County Executive Airport and an authorized Pilatus, Piper aircraft dealership and service center. It was formerly a Diamond Aircraft dealership and service center.

Air Associates of Kansas is an FBO at Johnson County Executive Airport and an authorized Cessna Service Center and Cessna Pilot Center. It provides flight training, charter, maintenance, fuel, hangar, aircraft tiedowns and pilot supplies.

Accidents and incidents
On February 13, 2022, a Piper PA-46 crashed shortly after takeoff at 10:30 am, killing its pilot, the only occupant on board. The pilot was a resident of Laguna Niguel, California, and was also the city's former mayor.

References 

Airport Master Record (FAA Form 5010), also available as a printable form (PDF)
OJC (Great Circle Airport Data)

External links
 at the Johnson County website

Airports in Kansas
Transportation in Olathe, Kansas
Buildings and structures in Johnson County, Kansas
Buildings and structures in Olathe, Kansas